Martin Fraisl (born 10 May 1993) is an Austrian professional footballer who plays as a goalkeeper for  club Arminia Bielefeld.

Club career
In July 2021, Fraisl joined Schalke 04.

On 24 August 2022, Fraisl moved to Arminia Bielefeld.

International career
He was called up to the senior Austria squad for the UEFA Nations League matches against  Croatia, Denmark, France and Denmark on 3, 6, 10 and 13 June 2022.

Career statistics

Honours
Schalke 04
2. Bundesliga: 2021–22

References

External links
 
 Martin Fraisl at Austrian Football Association  

1997 births
Living people
Austrian footballers
Association football goalkeepers
Eredivisie players
Liga I players
2. Bundesliga players
2. Liga (Austria) players
Regionalliga players
Wiener Sport-Club players
SC Wiener Neustadt players
Floridsdorfer AC players
FC Botoșani players
SV Sandhausen players
ADO Den Haag players
FC Schalke 04 players
FC Schalke 04 II players
Arminia Bielefeld players
Austrian expatriate footballers
Austrian expatriate sportspeople in Romania
Expatriate footballers in Romania
Austrian expatriate sportspeople in Germany
Expatriate footballers in Germany